Sharon Walsh-Arnold (née Walsh; born February 24, 1952) is a former professional tennis player from the United States.

Walsh enjoyed a long career, playing her first Grand Slam singles event in 1969 and her last Grand Slam doubles match in 1990. She was a finalist at the 1979 Australian Open where she lost to Barbara Jordan. She reached the fourth round of the 1981 US Open and the final of the doubles there the following year with Barbara Potter. She did not claim a WTA Tour singles title, but she had some success against top players, beating Hana Mandlíková in both their encounters (Christchurch 1978 and Australian Open 1983). She achieved her highest singles ranking of 22 in 1982, but was regarded as a doubles player, winning 30 titles in all.

Walsh married Michael H. Pete on April 20, 1985 in Sausalito, California. She competed as Sharon Walsh-Pete as from May 1985. Currently(2011) she is married to Steve Arnold and lives in Colorado Springs where she has been a tennis teacher since 2001.

WTA Tour finals

Singles: 1 (0–1)

Doubles: 44 (23–21)

Grand Slam singles performance timeline

Note: The Australian Open was held twice in 1977, in January and December.

See also

 Performance timelines for all female tennis players who reached at least one Grand Slam final

References

External links
 
 
 

1952 births
Living people
American female tennis players
Tennis players from San Francisco
Wimbledon champions
Wimbledon junior champions
Grand Slam (tennis) champions in girls' singles
21st-century American women